Stancho Kolev Ivanov (born 11 April 1937) is a retired Bulgarian freestyle wrestler. He competed in the featherweight category at the 1960 and 1964 Olympics and won silver medals on both occasions.

References

External links
 

1937 births
Living people
Olympic wrestlers of Bulgaria
Wrestlers at the 1960 Summer Olympics
Wrestlers at the 1964 Summer Olympics
Bulgarian male sport wrestlers
Olympic silver medalists for Bulgaria
Olympic medalists in wrestling
Sportspeople from Stara Zagora
World Wrestling Championships medalists
Medalists at the 1964 Summer Olympics
Medalists at the 1960 Summer Olympics
20th-century Bulgarian people
21st-century Bulgarian people